Dolfijn (Dutch for dolphin) may refer to:

 , the name of four Royal Netherlands Navy submarines
 , a class of Royal Netherlands Navy submarines built in the late 1950s and the early 1960s
 De Dolfijn, a Dutch ship involved in the Kettle War of 1784

See also
 Dolphin (disambiguation)